Daniel Cerantola Fuzato (born 4 July 1997) is a Brazilian professional footballer who plays as a goalkeeper for Segunda División club Ibiza.

Club career
A youth product of Palmeiras since 2010, Fuzato signed with Roma on 7 July 2018. He made his professional debut  in a 3–1 Serie A win over Juventus on 1 August 2020.

On 19 August 2020 he joined Gil Vicente on loan.

On 21 June 2022, Fuzato signed a three-year contract with Ibiza in Spain.

International career
Fuzato was born in Brazil and is of Italian descent, and has both passports. Fuzato is a youth international for Brazil, having represented the Brazil U20s once in 2016. He has been called up to represent Brazil U23s and the senior Brazil squad in 2019.

Honours 
Roma
 UEFA Europa Conference League: 2021–22

References

External links

1997 births
Living people
People from Santa Bárbara d'Oeste
Brazilian footballers
Brazil youth international footballers
Brazilian people of Italian descent
Association football goalkeepers
Serie A players
A.S. Roma players
Sociedade Esportiva Palmeiras players
Gil Vicente F.C. players
UD Ibiza players
Brazilian expatriate footballers
Expatriate footballers in Italy
Brazilian expatriate sportspeople in Italy
Expatriate footballers in Portugal
Brazilian expatriate sportspeople in Portugal
Expatriate footballers in Spain
Brazilian expatriate sportspeople in Spain
Footballers from São Paulo (state)
UEFA Europa Conference League winning players